Hellmut Maneval (13 November 1898 – 19 April 1967) was a German international footballer.

References

1898 births
1967 deaths
Association football midfielders
German footballers
Germany international footballers
Stuttgarter Kickers players